Father Paulo Ricardo de Azevedo Júnior (Recife, November 7, 1967) is a Brazilian Catholic priest, TV host, writer, and professor.

Priestly activity 
He is currently Parochial Vicar of Cristo Rei Parish, in Várzea Grande (Metropolitan Region of Cuiabá, state of Mato Grosso).  

As an extra apostolate, he is dedicated to evangelization through the media.

Ordination 
He endorsed at the Cuiabá Seminary in 1985 and was ordained a priest on June 14, 1992, by Pope John Paul II.  

He got a master's degree in Rome (Pontifical Gregorian University).

Career

First years 
In 1997, he went through a conversion experience, guided by the model of the Carmelite nun Therese of Lisieux.

In 2002 he became an avid reader of philosopher Olavo de Carvalho. 

In 2005 he experienced an air incident between São Paulo and Cuiabá, which led him to have a different preaching, "a clearer preaching against the mainstream tendency".

Regional and national presence 
He hosted the weekly program The Eighth Day, on TV Canção Nova, in 2007. 

He was one of the priests selected to preach at the World Youth Day 2013, in Rio de Janeiro.

Often he is invited to preach at the region of Cuiabá.

Conservative writer, author of nine books, he has more than 1.4 million followers on Facebook, and 1.3 million followers on Instagram. He is a major conservative leader in Brazil. The writer, journalist and philosopher Olavo de Carvalho was a major influence in his work.

Censorship and persecution 
In 2022, his Telegram channel underwent censorship by Brazil's Superior Court of Justice.

As a professor 
He teaches Theology at the Benedict XVI Institute of the Diocese of Lorena (state of São Paulo), since 2011.

Website 
Father Paulo Ricardo also teaches courses related to the Catholic religion and conservatism. Since 2006 he has dedicated part of his time to an internet apostolate by the name of PadrePauloRicardo.Org. Overall the website contains 44 courses on several topics, ranging from the lives of the saints to morality and spirituality. With a current reach on Facebook, YouTube and Spotify of over 3 million viewers, Father Paulo has been responsible for countless conversions in Brazil and worldwide.

Courses 
Some notable courses, by online attendance.
 Cultural Revolution and Marxism
 Frankfurt School
 History of the Church
 Therapy of Spiritual Illness
 The evil of pornography and masturbation
 The Inquisition
 The Way of Perfection
 Luther and the Modern World
 The Church and the Modern World
 The Secret of Saint Thérèse The Little Flower
 Thomas Aquinas' Summa Theologica
 G. K. Chesterton
 Tolkien's The Lord of the Rings
 Louis of Montfort
 Pope John Paul II's Theology of the Body
 C. S. Lewis' Chronicles of Narnia
 Philosophy of language

Books

See also 

 Cimbres Marian apparition

External links
 Official website
 YouTube channel

References

1967 births
Living people
Brazilian anti-communists
Brazilian Roman Catholic priests
20th-century Brazilian Roman Catholic priests
21st-century Brazilian Roman Catholic priests
Brazilian writers
Pontifical Gregorian University alumni
People from Recife
Brazilian conspiracy theorists